Baneheide (Ripuarian:   is a hamlet in the Dutch province of Limburg. It is a part of the municipality of Simpelveld, and lies about 9 km southwest of Kerkrade.

It was first mentioned in 1603 or 1604 as Baenenheidt, and means "cultivated heath".

National monuments 
Baneheide has four farms that have been designated national monuments.

References

Populated places in Limburg (Netherlands)
Simpelveld